Edgewood High School is a public high school in Edgewood, Ohio, in Ashtabula Township.  It is the sole high school operated by the Buckeye Local School District in Ashtabula County, Ohio.


Background
Before the current Edgewood High School was built, the building now used as Braden Middle School served as the district’s high school. The current location was opened in 1960.

The district is bordered by Lake Erie to the north, the city of Conneaut and Conneaut High School to the east, the city of Ashtabula and Lakeside High School to the west, and the city of Jefferson and Jefferson Area High School to the south.

The school's mascot is a Warrior and the students are commonly referred to as the Edgewood Warriors. There has been controversy over the school’s mascot, which is a caricature of a Native American warrior. A Change.org petition was created in 2020 calling for the mascot to be retired which received over 1,700 signatures.   

The Edgewood Fight Song was written by former band director Gene Milford. The song resembles the style of Cherokee music in the introduction. Then it quickly turns into a fast paced march.

The Edgewood Botany team has won first place in the annual Ashtabula County Botany competition for the past four consecutive years.

Ohio High School Athletic Association State Championships
 Boys Cross Country – 1990, 2003

Notable alumni
Freddie Smith, actor

References

External links
 District Website
 Ohio Department of Education

High schools in Ashtabula County, Ohio
Public high schools in Ohio
1960 establishments in Ohio